A retention schedule is a listing of organizational information types, or series of information in a manner which facilitates the understanding and application of the identified and approved retention period, and other information retention aspects.

Purpose
Retention schedules are an important aspect of records management. Many organizations are subject to rules and regulations (at the local, state or federal level) that govern for how long they are required to keep records before they can safely dispose of them. Holding onto records for longer than required can expose the organization to unnecessary liability, since such records are discoverable during lawsuits.

Basic information
  Record/series title (name)
  Description of information within record/series
  Approved retention period
  Appropriate security requirements
  Appropriate destruction method

Further items for schedule consideration
  Location of retention
  Date record type/series approved
  Responsible group/office/person(s) of record
  Remarks related to record/series
  Series number applied to a specific record/series

See also
 Records management is the process of ensuring that in whatever form,  records are maintained and managed economically, effectively and efficiently throughout their life cycle in the organization. 
 Information governance is the protection of records from access by individuals that are not supposed to access the records.

References

External links
ARMA – How do I build a Retention Schedule?

Public records
Records management
Information management
Information governance